The Lo Presti family of Bardonecchia is a clan of the 'Ndrangheta, a mafia-type organization originally from Marina di Gioiosa Ionica in Calabria with criminal base in Bardonecchia in Piedmont, North Italy. In Calabria they're known as  Maneja Family . The clan has closely related to the Mazzaferro 'ndrina. Initially created as an integral to the Mazzaferro 'ndrina, it became a faction and later a family of its own. It was the family of the 'Ndrangheta hegemonic in the area of Val di Susa together with that of Mazzaferro 'ndrina. 

The infiltration of the Lo Presti family in the public administration led in 1995 the President of the Italian Republic to dissolve the municipal council of Bardonecchia, giving the alpine town the sad record of first and only municipality in Northern Italy dissolved for alleged mafia infiltrations.

The Lo Presti family had connections with all the most important mafia families of Calabria and Sicily. Also had business relations with the Inzerillo family, Spatola-Gambino of Palermo, through which he made alliances overseas with the Gambino crime family of New York City, and with the families of the 'Ndrangheta in Canada, of Rocco Zito, Michele Racco, Cosimo Stalteri in Toronto and Vic Cotroni in Montreal. 

According to a justice witness, in recent years, the relationship with the Mazzaferro cousins has cracked and Lo Presti has approached and allied with the Aquino family, rivals of the Mazzaferro 'ndrina. The family is currently governed by the nephews of Rocco Lo Presti, the brothers Luciano and Giuseppe Ursino.

The rise of the Ursinos, the Lo Presti nephews

In 1993, nephew Giuseppe Ursino along with 15 other people were arrested in Bardonecchia for the trafficking of arms and drugs. Exponents of the Cataldo 'ndrina from Locri and Commisso 'ndrina from Siderno are also involved and arrested.

Since 2000, the criminal structures in Bardonecchia changed. Lo Presti named his successors, his favourite nephews, the brothers Luciano and Giuseppe Ursino. Soon after, Luciano Ursino entered into business relations with the brothers Adolfo and Aldo Cosimo Crea, originating from Stilo, Calabria, emerging bosses of the 'Ndrangheta in Turin.

In 2003, on the eve of the 2006 Winter Olympic Games in Turin, he began to talk about tenders in Val di Susa. The Works Director of the Turin-Bardonecchia highway (Autostrada A32), and the Turin Agency for 2006 Winter Olympics, received envelopes with bullets. The Ursinos managed to bribe a police inspector who informed them about the investigation and gave them a scanner to find wiretaps.

In April 2004, the Ursinos approached a politician to try to obtain European Union funding, and set up a million dollar usury ring. Among the victims of usury, was a political figure, who denounced the organization, and in November 2006 Rocco Lo Presti was arrested along with his Ursino nephews.

In February 2018, Giuseppe Ursino and Ercole Taverniti were arrested for extortion and criminal mafia association, and seized all commercial activities, bars and restaurants.

References

External links 

Gli Ursino puntavano ai fondi di Bruxelles La Stampa 6 ottobre 2008
Gli Ursino i nipoti del boss La Stampa 6 ottobre 2008 
Il progetto politico del clan Lo Presti La Stampa 6 ottobre 2008 
Luciano Ursino patteggia 4 anni e torna a casa La Stampa 17 aprile 2008

1960s establishments in Italy
'Ndrine